Patrick Dowling is the name of:

 Patrick Dowling (producer) (1919–2009), British TV producer
 Patrick Dowling (hurler), member of the Kerry hurling squad
 Patrick J. Dowling (born 1939), British engineer and educationalist, vice-chancellor of the University of Surrey